The Cuango or Kwango is a transboundary river of Angola and Democratic Republic of Congo. It is the largest left bank tributary of the Kasai River in the Congo River basin.  It flows through Malanje in Angola. The Kwango River basin has large resources of diamonds in the Chitamba-Lulo Kimberlite Cluster in Lunda Norte Province, discovered in the main river channel and on flats and terraces in its flood plains.

History
The Rund Kingdom, which expanded to become the Lunda Empire, encompassed territory stretching from Kwango River to the Luapula River. Its rulers partook in the slave trade. Lunda's expansion in the valley promoted a common political and cultural heritage while also promoting slave trading, accounting for the low population densities between the Kwango and Kwilu rivers.

The Portuguese colonized the Kwango River valley and usurped the Kingdom of Kasanje. The Kwango River was subject to a Portuguese treaty signing in Lisbon on May 25, 1891, and the Declaration of March 24, 1894.

Cuango, located in Lunda Norte Province within the Cuango River Valley, is considered to be “in the diamond heartland of northeastern Angola”, the richest diamond area in Angola. The town played an important role during the Angolan Civil War, as both Uniao Nacional para a Independencia Total de Angola (UNITA) and government forces attempted to seize and hold the city. UNITA surrendered the town to the government on 30 September, 1997, as part of the Lusaka Protocol.

Geography

The Cuango originates in the highlands of Alto Chicapa in the Angolan province of Lunda Sul, and flows south–north-west, crossing the border with the Democratic Republic of the Congo, and joining the Kasai River near the town of Bandundo. Thereafter, it empties into the Congo River. Rising in the Lunda plateau, the river forms a deep valley.

Its right bank tributaries are the Wamba and Kwilu rivers.

Navigation
The Cuango has a number of falls and rapids.

Water resources
The lean season flow in the river occurs during August. The average annual discharge in the lower reaches of the river is /s

Culture
The river valley is inhabited by the Yaka, the Suku, the Mbala, and the Pende tribal groups. Their crafting skills are seen in the form of mask carvings in geometric patterns of figurines, and other carved objects.

Economy
While the river is used for fishing, the valley is developed to the extent of providing subsistence agriculture only. Of note historically is palm oil and rubber production.

The main economic activity and revenue to the Angolan State is derived by extraction of diamonds from the valley. The river basin has a rich source of diamonds in the Chitamba-Lulo Kimberlite Cluster in Lunda Norte Province, which was discovered in the main river channel and on flats and terraces in its flood plains. The provinces of Lunda Norte and Lund Sul in the river valley account for largest number of diamond mines in the valley and in Angola.

Under the mining license held by Soiadale de Desenvolvimento Mineiro (SDM), the areas of production is on the Tazua and Ginge River diversions on the Cuango.

References

Rivers of Angola
Border rivers
Rivers of the Democratic Republic of the Congo
International rivers of Africa
Kasai River
Angola–Democratic Republic of the Congo border